Sargodha Cantonment (Urdu: سرگودھا کنٹونمنٹ) is a cantonment adjacent to the Sargodha Airbase in Sargodha, Punjab, Pakistan.

Pakistan's largest airbase, PAF Base Mushaf (formerly PAF Base Sargodha), is situated here and hosts the headquarters of the Pakistan Air Force's Central Air Command. 

The airbase is also home to the Combat Commanders School (CCS), formerly the Fighter Leader's School.

See also
PAF Base Mushaf
Cantonment (Pakistan)

References

Cantonments of Pakistan
Sargodha
Populated places in Sargodha District